This is a list of people from the Louisville metropolitan area which consists of the Kentucky county of Jefferson and the Indiana counties of Clark and Floyd in the United States. Included are notable people who were either born or raised there, or have maintained residency for a significant period.

Actors and entertainment

Artists and designers

Business

Musicians

Politicians, military, civil service, activists

Science

Sports

Religion 
 LaVerne Butler, pastor of 9th & O Baptist Church in Louisville, 1969–1988; president of Mid-Continent University, 1988–1997
 Edward Porter Humphrey, Presbyterian minister, gave dedicatory address for Cave Hill Cemetery
 Edward William Cornelius Humphrey, lawyer, Presbyterian leader, author, trustee of Centre College and Louisville Presbyterian Theological Seminary
 Eugene Ulrich, theologist and chief editor for interpretation of the Dead Sea Scrolls

Writers, publishers, journalists

Other 
 William Burke Belknap, philanthropist, breeder of American saddlebred horses, owner of Land O' Goshen Farms
 Squire Boone, frontiersman and brother of Daniel Boone
 Kathy Cary, chef and a seven-time James Beard Award nominee
 Jennie Casseday, philanthropist
 Laura Miller Derry, attorney, first woman to defend a court-martial case brought by the United States Army
 Bob Edwards, broadcaster for National Public Radio
 Abraham Flexner, educator, best known for his role in the 20th-century reform of medical and higher education in the US and Canada
 Increase A. Lapham, surveyor, naturalist, helped found the U.S Weather Bureau
 Frank Neuhauser, winner of the first National Spelling Bee, held in 1925
 Jeffrey Wigand, 60 Minutes tobacco industry whistleblower
 York, William Clark's manservant and participant in Lewis and Clark Expedition
 John Ziegler, radio talk show host

See also
 List of University of Louisville people
 List of people from Kentucky
 List of people from Lexington, Kentucky

References

 
Louisville
 People
Louisville metropolitan area
Louisville metropolitan area